Rev. John Brown (June 15, 1763 – December 11, 1842) was the third president of the University of Georgia.  He served in that capacity from 1811 until his resignation in 1816.

He was born on June 15, 1763 in County Antrim, Ireland, the son of Walter and Margaret Brown, who were Scottish-Irish Presbyterians. At the age of three, he emigrated with his parents to America aboard the ship The Earl of Donegal, arriving in Charleston, South Carolina harbor on December 22, 1767. Brown's father obtained 200 acres per the Bounty Act of the South Carolina General Assembly, passed the 25th day of July 1761 to Protestants willing to settle in the South Carolina back-country that became Chester County. The Browns joined the Fishing Creek Presbyterian church.

When the American Revolution came to their area in 1780, John Brown, then 17, joined the South Carolina Militia under the command of Capt. John McClure and General Thomas Sumter. He was in the first attack on the British at Rocky Mount and at the Battle of Hanging Rock. Being a known patriot family, the British burned the family home, driving his parents to Mecklenburg County, North Carolina. Brown's sister, Jane Brown Gaston, was known for her bravery during the war as well.

After the war, John resumed his education. He studied under Dr. S. E. McCorkle in Salisbury, North Carolina and received a Doctor of Divinity degree. In 1788, the Presbytery of Concord (NC) licensed Brown as a Presbyterian minister. The now Reverend John Brown's first pastoral post was Old Waxsaw Presbyterian church, in Lancaster, South Carolina. Also in 1788, he married the former Miss Mary McCullough of Salisbury.

In 1792, Brown reorganized the congregations of Upper, Middle, and Lower Fishing Creek Presbyterian churches into one, and renamed them Richardson Presbyterian. From here in 1793, Brown was called to be the pastor of Beaver Creek, Hanging Rock and Miller's congregations in Kershaw County, South Carolina.

One of Brown's main concerns was education. For the next ten years, he was a professor at South Carolina College (later the university). During this time, he helped start schools: Lancaster Academy (SC) in 1802, and Wadesboro Academy (NC) in 1803, and served as a trustee and president. In 1811, Brown became President of the University of Georgia in Athens. He served in this post until 1816.

After he resigned as President of the University of Georgia, Brown became pastor of Mt. Zion Church in Hancock County, Georgia. He ministered to this congregation for the next twelve years. Next, he was pastor at the Washington (GA) Presbyterian church before he began missionary work in the south Georgia frontier near Fort Gaines in Clay County, Georgia.

Brown died on December 11, 1842 in Fort Gaines. He is buried in the Old Pioneer Cemetery, alongside his wife of 48 years.

References
From Ahmedunggar to Lavonia Presidents at the University of Georgia 1785-1997, University of Georgia Libraries, Hargrett Rare Book and Manuscript Library

1763 births
1842 deaths
Presidents of the University of Georgia
People from County Antrim
People from Chester County, South Carolina
People from Salisbury, North Carolina
People from Lancaster, South Carolina
People from Hancock County, Georgia
People from Clay County, Georgia
Kingdom of Ireland emigrants to the Thirteen Colonies
Burials in Georgia (U.S. state)